Jamalus Sattar was a Member of the 3rd National Assembly of Pakistan as a representative of East Pakistan.

Career
Sattar was a Member of the  3rd National Assembly of Pakistan representing Chittagong- III.

References

Pakistani MNAs 1962–1965
Living people
Year of birth missing (living people)